Tadeusz Strumiłło (1884–1958) was a Polish teacher, harcmistrz (the highest Scouting instructor rank in Poland), the president of the Polish Scouting and Guiding Association (ZHP) from 1923 to 1925. A pedagogue and psychologist, he taught in the Jagiellonian University, and the Catholic University of Lublin. During World War II he was one of the lecturers of the underground universities and supported the Polish Scout resistance movement, the Grey Ranks.

References
 Scouting Round the World, John S. Wilson, first edition, Blandford Press 1959 p. 102 127

1884 births
1958 deaths
Polish Scouts and Guides
Polish educators
Academic staff of Jagiellonian University
Academic staff of the John Paul II Catholic University of Lublin